Marino Tartaglia (3 August 1894 – 21 April 1984) was  a Croatian  painter and art teacher, for many years a professor at the Academy of Fine Arts, Zagreb.

From 1948 he was a member of the Croatian Academy of Sciences and Arts. He received the Vladimir Nazor Award for lifetime achievement in the arts in 1964.

Biography 
Marino Tartaglia was born 3 August 1894 in Zagreb. He completed elementary school and the Royal High School in Split. In 1907 he encountered Emanuel Vidović, and became interested in painting. He studied drawing with Virgil Meneghello Dinčić. In He enrolled in the Architectural School ( Građevna stručna škola) in Zagreb (1908–1912) where among his teachers were well-known painters: Oton Iveković, Ivan Tišov, Robert Frangeš Mihanović and Bela Čikoš Sesija. In the turbulent times before the First World War, fearing political persecution, he left for Italy, first to Florence, then to Rome, where in 1913 he enrolled in the Instituto Superiore di Belle Arti.

He spent a brief time as a volunteer on the Salonika front, but quickly returned to Rome where he worked an assistant to Ivan Meštrović, then returned to Florence where he got to know the Futurist artists Carlo Carrà, Giorgio de Chirico and others.

Following the war, he spent time in Split (1918–1921), then travelled to Vienna, Belgrade, and Paris. Returning to Zagreb in 1931, at the request of Vladimir Becić, Tartaglia started work as a trainee teacher at the Academy of Fine Arts, becoming a lecturer in 1940, associate professor in 1944, and full professor in 1947. He trained several generations of Croatian painters.

From 1948 he was a full member of the Croatian Academy of Sciences and Arts. In 1964, he received the Vladimir Nazor Award for Lifetime Achievement in the arts. In 1975, he held a retrospective exhibition at the Art Pavilion in Zagreb.

Marino Tartaglia died 21 April 1984 in Zagreb.

Legacy 
In his early works, Tartaglia showed the influence of Cézanne and the post-Impressionists, while later works the flat colourful masses become almost completely abstract – verging on  figurative. Tartaglia was especially impressive in his series of self-portraits which showed signs of expressionism from 1917, and were completely abstract by the 1960s. His work was spontaneous, with a connection to primitive art, such as that of ancient cave paintings.

Works

 Self-portrait, 1917 — Expressionist style painting
 Self-portrait, 1920
 Marjan Through the Olive (Marjan kroz masline) 1920
 Still Life with Statue II (Mrtva priroda s kipom II), 1921
 Combing (Češljanje), 1924
 Still Life with fruits and basket, 1926
 Small Breakwater (Mali lukobran), 1927
 Landscape (Pejsaž), 1928
 Portrait of Mrs Fink I (Portret gđe Fink I), 1935
 My Wife (Moja žena), 1936
 Painter (Slikar), 1966 
 Flowers I (Cvijeće I), 1966

Exhibitions
Throughout his sixty-year artistic career, Tartaglia held 30 solo exhibitions and over 270 group exhibitions at home and abroad. He participated in the Venice Biennale of 1940.

Solo shows
Selected recent solo exhibitions include
 2009 Marino Tartaglia – Gallery Adris, Rovinj
 2004 Marino Tartaglia : Retrospektivna izložba – Galerija Umjetnina Split, Split
 2003 Galerija Klovićevi dvori, Zagreb
 1975/6 Retrospective Exhibition at the Art Pavilion in Zagreb
 1971  Marino Tartaglia – Gallery of Fine Arts, Split
 1964  Marino Tartaglia – Gallery of Fine Arts, Split

Group shows
Selected recent group exhibitions include

 2008  From the holdings of the museum – Museum of Modern Art Dubrovnik, Dubrovnik
 2007  Iz fundusa galerije – Museum of Modern Art Dubrovnik, Dubrovnik
 2006  Croatian Collection – Museum of Contemporary Art Skopje, Skopje

Public collections
His work can be found in the following public collections

Croatia
 Gallery of Fine Arts, Split (Galerija Umjetnina) Split
 Museum of Contemporary Art, Zagreb (Muzej Suvremene Umjetnosti)
 Museum of Modern Art Dubrovnik, Dubrovnik
 Muzej Moslavine, Kutina

Macedonia (F.Y.R.M.)
 Museum of Contemporary Art, Skopje

Serbia
 Museum of Contemporary Art, Belgrade

Slovenia
  Modern Gallery (Moderna Galerija), Ljubljana

References

Bibliography
 Tonko Maroević: Monografija, Galerija Klovićevi dvori, Zagreb 2003., 
 Igor Zidić: Marino Tartaglia (1894–1984), Moderna galerija, 2009., 
 Božo Bek, Mića Bašićević: Marino Tartaglia (katolog izložbe), Galerija suvremene umjetnosti Zagreb, 1967.
 Željka Čorak, Tonko Maroević: Marino Tartaglia (katolog izložbe), Umjetnički paviljon, Zagreb, 1975.

Abstract painters
Expressionist painters
Modern painters
1894 births
1984 deaths
Members of the Croatian Academy of Sciences and Arts
Vladimir Nazor Award winners
Academic staff of the University of Zagreb
Artists from Zagreb
People from the Kingdom of Dalmatia
Burials at Mirogoj Cemetery
20th-century Croatian painters
Croatian male painters
20th-century Croatian male artists